Echinopsis angelesii is a species of cactus.

Synonyms
 Trichocereus angelesiae R. Kiesling

References
 The Plant List entry
 Encyclopedia of Life entry
 Cactus In Habitat entry
 Plantae entry

angelesii